Antonavich is a Belarusian patronymic name used per Eastern Slavic naming customs. Notable people with this name include the following:

Alyaksandr Antonavich Anyukevich full name of Alyaksandr Anyukevich (born 1992), Belarusian footballer
Eduard Antonavich Vaytsyakhovich full name of Eduard Vaytsyakhovich (1960 – 2022), Belarusian politician
Viktar Antonavich Shalkevich full name of Viktar Shalkevich (born 1959), Belarusian actor, poet and singer-songwriter

See also

Antonovich

Belarusian-language surnames
Patronymic surnames